The Zhenhai Tower, also known as the Five-Story Pagoda, is a tower in Guangzhou, Guangdong. It is located in Yuexiu Park, in central Guangzhou. It now houses the Guangzhou Museum.

History
It was first built in 1380, at the beginning of the Ming dynasty, by the Yongjia Marquis Zhu Liangzu.

Popular culture
By the time it was the highest building of Guangzhou when it was constructed. For a long period of time, it was the symbol of Guangzhou before the Wuyang Statue was built.

Gallery

See also
 Yuexiu Hill

References

External links

Guangzhou Museum

Buildings and structures completed in 1380
Towers completed in the 14th century
Buildings and structures in Guangzhou
Yuexiu District
Ming dynasty architecture
Museums in Guangzhou
History museums in China
Art museums and galleries in China
National first-grade museums of China